Pia Zimmermann (born 17 September 1956) is a German politician. Born in Braunschweig, Lower Saxony, she represents The Left. Pia Zimmermann has served as a member of the Bundestag from the state of Lower Saxony from 2013 until 2021.

Life 
Zimmermann graduated from secondary school in 1972, followed by a commercial apprenticeship, which she completed in 1975. After completing her apprenticeship, she passed her school-leaving examination on the second educational pathway and studied social services from 1980 to 1984. After her studies, she worked as a staff member in the disability aid until 1999. Afterwards she was job-seeking until 2005 and trained as a media designer. After completing this training, she worked in the constituency office of Dorothée Menzner, Member of the Bundestag. She became member of the Bundestag after the 2013 German federal election. She was a member of the Health Committee.

References

External links 

  
 Bundestag biography 

1956 births
Living people
Members of the Bundestag for Lower Saxony
Female members of the Bundestag
21st-century German women politicians
Members of the Bundestag 2017–2021
Members of the Bundestag 2013–2017
Members of the Bundestag for The Left
Members of the Landtag of Lower Saxony